The Żywiec Beskids is a mountain range in the Outer Western Carpathians in southern Poland. It is the second highest range in Poland, after the Tatra Mountains. The highest peak is Babia Góra (1,725 m) and Pilsko (1,557 m).

References 

Mountain ranges of Poland
Mountain ranges of the Western Carpathians
Landforms of Silesian Voivodeship
Landforms of Lesser Poland Voivodeship